Yahiya Doumbia (born 25 August 1963) is a retired professional tennis player from Senegal. He won two singles titles during his career on the ATP Tour, both as a qualifier. He reached a career-high singles ranking of No. 74 in 1988. Doumbia played for the Senegal Davis Cup team, and holds team records for singles wins, doubles wins, and total wins, amassing a 44-19 record in 11 years of play.

ATP career finals

Singles: 2 (2 titles)

ATP Challenger and ITF Futures finals

Singles: 4 (2–2)

Doubles: 4 (2–2)

Performance timeline

Singles

External links
 
 
 

1963 births
Living people
Senegalese male tennis players
Sportspeople from Bamako
African Games medalists in tennis
African Games bronze medalists for Senegal
Competitors at the 1987 All-Africa Games
21st-century Malian people